Chien de Jean de Nivelle (Jean de Nivelle's dog) is an animal or a man who does not want to obey when called, as in the expression Here comes the dog of Jean de Nivelle, it flees when it is called. The origins of the expression are unknown. It is thought that this Jean de Nivelle refused to help his father, Jean II of Montmorency, to support Louis XI in the war against the duke of Burgundy. Furious, his father disinherited him and Jean de Nivelle fled to Flanders, hoping to avoid further troubles.

References

French proverbs
Metaphors referring to dogs